Brookfield-LaGrange Park School District 95 (D95) is a school district headquartered in Brookfield, Illinois in the Chicago area.

It includes most of Brookfield and parts of LaGrange Park and North Riverside.

Mark Kuzniewski became the superintendent in 2009. He was previously the principal of Buffalo Grove District 102's Aptakisic Junior High School. In 2020 Kuzniewski received a five-year contract renewal.

It operates Brook Park Elementary School and S.E. Gross Middle School.

References

External links
 Brookfield-LaGrange Park School District 95

School districts in Cook County, Illinois
Brookfield, Illinois